The Fragility of Goodness is a 1986 philosophical book by Martha Nussbaum, which deals with philosophical topics such as the meaning of life by seeking the dialogue with ancient philosophers, such as Aristotle, to whom Nussbaum pays much attention in many of her other works as well.

Reviews

Patrick O'Sullivan (2002), Bryn Mawr Classical Review.

See also
 Ethics

References

1986 non-fiction books
Philosophy books